The Texas Cavalry Service Medal was a Texas Army National Guard service medal established by the State Legislature on June 17, 2005. It was awarded to those who served in the 124th Cavalry Regiment on or after September 11, 2001 in a hostile fire zone as designated by the Secretary of Defense.

Background 
This medal is a one time award and there is no provision for subsequent awards. The first 182 cavalry troopers eligible for the award completed their tour of duty in Iraq on February 11, 2005. Carrying the same unit heraldry as the 1st Squadron, 124th Cavalry Regiment, members of the Texas National Guard's Brigade Reconnaissance Troops mobilized for Operation Iraqi Freedom III were also eligible for this award.

The Texas Combat Service Ribbon was established by Senator Kel Seliger in Senate Bill 955, authorized by the Seventy-ninth Texas Legislature, and approved by Governor Rick Perry on June 17, 2005, effective the same date.

Design 
The pendant is a Texas Ranger style medal with a gold outer ring, cutout antique ivory star, with crossed sabers centered on the star. The gold outer ring is encircled by the words, “TEXAS CAVALRY”. The pendant is suspended by a ring from a silk moiré ribbon 1-3/8 inches wide, composed of stripes of yellow (15/32 of an inch), green (3/16 of an inch), white (7/16 of an inch), green (3/16 of an inch), and yellow (15/32 of an inch). An enameled cross sabers 3/8 of an inch in circumscribing diameter, is centered on the ribbon.

See also 
 Awards and decorations of the Texas Military

References

2005 establishments in Texas
Texas
Awards established in 2005
United States service medals